Hisar is a village in the Gercüş District of Batman Province in Turkey. The village is populated by Kurds of the Hesar tribe and had a population of 548 in 2021. Before the 2013 reorganisation, it was a town (belde).

The hamlet of Ekinli is attached to the village.

References 

Villages in Gercüş District
Kurdish settlements in Batman Province